Heinz Paul (13 August 1893 – 14 March 1983) was a German screenwriter, film producer and director. He was married to the actress Hella Moja.

Selected filmography

Director
 The Street of Forgetting (1923)
 The Dice Game of Life (1925)
 Department Store Princess (1926)
 U-9 Weddigen (1927)
 The False Prince (1927)
 The Carousel of Death  (1928)
 The Woman of Yesterday and Tomorrow (1928)
 Marriage in Name Only (1930)
 The Love Market (1930)
 Namensheirat (1930)
 Student Life in Merry Springtime (1931)
 The Other Side (1931)
 Circus Life (1931)
 Tannenberg (1932)
 Trenck (1932)
 Marschall Vorwärts (1932)
 William Tell (1934)
 The Four Musketeers (1934)
 Miracle of Flight (1935)
 Paul and Pauline (1936)
 Hilde and the Volkswagen (1936)
 Comrades at Sea (1938)
 Come Back to Me (1944)
 Good Fortune in Ohio (1950)
 Operation Edelweiss (1954)
 Marriages Forbidden (1957)
 The Elephant in a China Shop (1958)
 Hula-Hopp, Conny (1959)
 Oriental Nights (1960)

Producer
 The Castle in the South (1933)

Screenwriter
 Countess Walewska (1920)

Bibliography
 Kester, Bernadette. Film Front Weimar: Representations of the First World War in German films of the Weimar Period (1919-1933). Amsterdam University Press, 2003.

External links

1893 births
1983 deaths
Film people from Munich